Georges Salz or Georg Salz (20 November 1878 – 19 May 1949) was a freethinking Swiss writer, publisher and editor.

Biography 

Salz made an apprenticeship as a book printer. After living in England and Paris, he settled in Switzerland and acquired Swiss citizenship. In Bern he worked in large print shops and later founded his own enterprise together with Mettler.

In 1931 he married Rosa Rupp. He traveled to Europe, North Africa and Central America, and published books on his journeys. The publishers Mettler & Salz and Schären, Haeni & Salz, both based in Bern bore his name.

He was, among other things, editor of the organ of the Freethinkers Association of Switzerland Der Freidenker.

Publications (selection)

Monographs 

 Eine Reise nach den glücklichen Inseln. 1935. 
 Eine Reise nach der Côte d'Azur. 1936. 
 Ins Reich der Mitternachtssonne. 1936. 
 Auf der Fährte des Christoph Columbus. 1938. 
 Vom Meeresstrand zum Wüstenrand. 1939. 
 Im Banne der Mythen. 1943.

Articles (selection) 

 S. Simon, Ingenieur-Topograph, 1857 — 1925, Mitglied der Ortsgruppe Bern der F. V. S. In: Geistesfreiheit, vol. 4 (1925), nr. 5.

Secondary source 

 Walter Schiess: Nachruf: Totentafel: Georg Salz in: Der Freidenker, vol. 32 (1949), nr. 7, p. 55.

Sources 

Secular humanists
Swiss writers in German
Swiss male writers
20th-century publishers (people)
Swiss book publishers (people)
1878 births
1949 deaths
German emigrants to Switzerland